Jadwiga Szoszler-Wilejto (born 22 January 1949) is a former Polish female Archer. She represented Poland at the Olympics on three occasions (1972, 1976 and in 1980).

References

External links 
Profile at World Archery
Profile in Polish
Sport bio in Polish

1949 births
Living people
Olympic archers of Poland
Archers at the 1972 Summer Olympics
Archers at the 1976 Summer Olympics
Archers at the 1980 Summer Olympics
People from Rzeszów